The College of Medicine, Rangsit University is the first private medical school and the ninth oldest medical school in Thailand.

History 
The Faculty of Medicine, Rangsit College was founded on 1 May 1989, following a successful proposal to the council of Thai Universities. On 1990, following the name change of Rangsit College to Rangsit University, the name changed to Faculty of Medicine, Rangsit University. On 15 March 1994, the university made an agreement with the Department of Medical Services, Ministry of Public Health to provide medical teaching facilities at Rajavithi Hospital and the Children's Hospital (now Queen Sirikit National Institute of Child Health). In February 1996, the university made an agreement with Harvard Medical School of Harvard University to improve medical education and set up a conference, of which all medical schools in Thailand attended.

On 1 May 2002, the faculty became the College of Medicine, Rangsit University, following the management model of Harvard University. In 2013, Lerdsin Hospital became affiliated to the college as a teaching hospital. Nopparat Rajathanee Hospital also became affiliated to the college in 2015 and accepted the first cohort of medical students in the 2021 academic year. Students applying to study medicine through the Consortium of Thai Medical Schools Examination (กสพท), can select to study at three different hospital groups: 1.Rajavithi and Queen Sirikit, 2.Lerdsin or 3.Nopparat Rajathanee.

Departments 

 Department of Anaethesiology
 Department of Emergency Medicine
 Department of Family Medicine
 Department of Internal Medicine
 Department of Obstetrics and Gynaecology
 Department of Orthopaedics
 Department of Ophthalmology
 Department of Otolaryngology
 Department of Pathology and Forensic Medicine
 Department of Paediatrics
 Department of Psychiatry
 Department of Radiology
 Department of  Rehabilitative Medicine
 Department of Surgery

Teaching hospitals 

 Rajavithi Hospital
 Queen Sirikit National Institute of Child Health
 Lerdsin Hospital
 Nopparat Rajathanee Hospital

See also 

 List of medical schools in Thailand

References 

 Article incorporates material from the corresponding article in the Thai Wikipedia.

Rangsit University
University departments in Thailand
Medical schools in Thailand